Mehmet Bedestenlioğlu (born 22 February 1959) is a Turkish volleyball coach. He's been coaching Turkish side PTT Spor since 2019.

External links
 Coach profile at WorldofVolley.com 
 Coach profile at Volleybox.net

1959 births
Living people
Sportspeople from Tokat
Galatasaray S.K. (women's volleyball) coaches
Turkish volleyball coaches
Turkish men's volleyball players
Volleyball coaches of international teams
Eczacıbaşı S.K. volleyball coaches
Turkey women's national volleyball team coaches